Sungul Snezhinsk, formerly known as Sungul Chelyabinsk is a Russian handball team located in Snezhinsk. They compete in the Russian Handball Super League.

In reaction to the 2022 Russian invasion of Ukraine, the International Handball Federation banned Russian athletes, and the European Handball Federation suspended the  Russian clubs from competing in European handball competitions.

Accomplishments

Russian Handball Super League:
Third Place : 2012

References

External links
 EHF Club profile
 Club history 

Sport in Chelyabinsk Oblast
Russian handball clubs